Jan Hoffmann (born 1 September 1979) is a German retired footballer who played as a midfielder.

References

External links
 

1979 births
Living people
People from Reutlingen (district)
Sportspeople from Tübingen (region)
German footballers
Association football midfielders
SSV Reutlingen 05 players
SpVgg Greuther Fürth players
SSV Jahn Regensburg players
VfB Lübeck players
Holstein Kiel players
2. Bundesliga players
3. Liga players
Regionalliga players
Footballers from Baden-Württemberg
Holstein Kiel II players